Tom Town is an unincorporated community in Cocke County, Tennessee, United States. The elevation of Tom Town is 1,722 feet.

References

Unincorporated communities in Cocke County, Tennessee
Unincorporated communities in Tennessee